Tanganika District was a district of the pre-2015 Katanga Province in the Democratic Republic of the Congo. 
The district dates back to the days of the Belgian Congo. 
At its greatest extent it roughly corresponded to the present Tanganyika Province, with a small portion in the southwest now in Haut-Lomami Province.

Belgian Congo

The original four provinces of the Belgian Congo had considerable autonomy, but in 1933 they were reorganized into six provinces, named after their capitals, and the central government assumed more control.
Katanga became Elisabethville Province.
The number of districts in the colony was reduced to 15.

Elisabethville Province was divided into Lualaba District in the west, and Tanganika and Haut-Katanga districts in the east.
Tanganika District was formed from the northern part of the Tanganika-Moero District.
A 1955–1957 map shows Tanganika District bordering Maniema District and Sud-Kivu District to the north, British territories to the east, Luapula-Moero District to the south, Haut-Lomami District to the southwest and Kabinda District to the west.

Post-Independence

On 11 July 1960, a few days after the Congo Republic had gained independence, the province of Katanga seceded as an independent state.
In November 1961 the northern portion was reconquered by the national government and made the province of Nord-Katanga (Tanganika).
On 21 January 1963 the remainder of Katanga was reconquered and divided into the provinces of Lualaba and Katanga Oriental.
Nord-Katanga, Lualaba and Katanga Oriental were merged back into the province of Katanga on 28 December 1966.
In 2015 the current Tanganyika Province was created from the Tanganika District, whose town of Kalemie was elevated to capital city of the new province.

Gallery

See also

 Districts of the Belgian Congo
 Districts of the Democratic Republic of the Congo

References

Sources

 

Districts of the Belgian Congo
Districts of Katanga Province